

The Caspar C 33 was a training aircraft developed in Germany in the late 1920s.

Specifications

References

C033
Biplanes
Single-engined tractor aircraft
Aircraft first flown in 1928